This is a list of airports in Sri Lanka.

Airport

Airport names shown in bold indicate the facility has scheduled passenger service on a commercial airline.

International airports

Domestic airports

Waterdromes

See also

 List of Sri Lankan air force bases
 
 Wikipedia:WikiProject Aviation/Airline destination lists: Asia#Sri Lanka

References

 
 
 
 
 
 
 
 

 
Sri Lanka
Airports
Airports
Sri Lanka